Tantric sex or sexual yoga refers to a wide range of practices carried on in Hindu and Buddhist tantra to exercise sexuality in a ritualized or yogic context.

In the past Tantric sex may have been associated with antinomian or elements such as the consumption of alcohol, and the offerings of substances like meat to deities. Moreover sexual fluids are viewed as "power substances" and may have been used ritualistically, either externally or internally.

The actual terms used in the classical texts to refer to this practice include "Karmamudra" (Tibetan: ལས་ཀྱི་ཕྱག་རྒྱ las kyi phyag rgya, "action seal") in Buddhist tantras and "Maithuna" (Devanagari: मैथुन, "coupling") in Hindu sources. In Hindu Tantra, Maithuna is the most important of the five makara (five tantric substances) and constitutes the main part of the Grand Ritual of Tantra variously known as Panchamakara, Panchatattva, and Tattva Chakra. In Tibetan Buddhism, karmamudra is often an important part of the completion stage of tantric practice.

While there may be some connection between these practices and the Kāmashāstra literature (which include the Kāmasūtra), the two practice traditions are separate methods with separate goals. As the British Indologist Geoffrey Samuel notes, while the kāmasāstra literature is about the pursuit of sexual pleasure (kāmā), sexual yoga practices are often aimed towards the quest for liberation (moksha).

History

According to Samuel, late Vedic texts like the Jaiminiya Brahmana, the Chandogya Upanisad, and the Brhadaranyaka Upanisad, "treat sexual intercourse as symbolically equivalent to the Vedic sacrifice, and ejaculation of semen as the offering." The Brhadaranyaka Upanishad contains various sexual rituals and practices which are mostly aimed at obtaining a child which are concerned with the loss of male virility and power. One passage from the Brhadaranyaka Upanishad states:

Her vulva is the sacrificial ground; her pubic hair is the sacred grass; her labia majora are the Soma-press; and her labia minora are the fire blazing at the centre. A man who engages in sexual intercourse with this knowledge obtains as great a world as a man who performs a Soma sacrifice, and he appropriates to himself the merits of the women with whom he has sex. The women, on the other hand, appropriate to themselves the merits of a man who engages in sexual intercourse with them without this knowledge. (Brhadaranyaka Upanishad 6.4.3, trans. Olivelle 1998: 88)

One of the earliest mentions of sexual yoga is in the Mahayana Buddhist Mahāyānasūtrālamkāra of Asanga (c. 5th century). The passage states:"Supreme self-control is achieved in the reversal of sexual intercourse in the blissful Buddha-poise and the untrammelled vision of one's spouse." According to David Snellgrove, the text's mention of a ‘reversal of sexual intercourse’ might indicate the practice of withholding ejaculation. Snellgrove states:

It is by no means improbable that already by the fifth century when Asanga was writing, these techniques of sexual yoga were being used in reputable Buddhist circles, and that Asanga himself accepted such a practice as valid. The natural power of the breath, inhaling and exhaling, was certainly accepted as an essential force to be controlled in Buddhist as well as Hindu yoga. Why therefore not the natural power of the sexual force? [...]  Once it is established that sexual yoga was already regarded by Asanga as an acceptable yogic practice, it becomes far easier to understand how Tantric treatises, despite their apparent contradiction of previous Buddhist teachings, were so readily canonized in the following centuries.

According to Geoffrey Samuel, while it is possible that some kind of sexual yoga existed in the fourth or fifth centuries,

Substantial evidence for such practices, however, dates from considerably later, from the seventh and eighth centuries, and derives from Saiva and Buddhist Tantric circles. Here we see sexual yoga as part of a specific complex of practices. On the Saiva side this is associated with a series of named teachers in South and North India, the Cittar (Siddha) teachers in the south, including Tirumülar and Bogar, and the so-called Nath  teachers in the north, where the principal names are Matsyendra (Matsyendranath) and Gorakh (Gorakhnath). On  the Buddhist side, it is associated with so-called Mahayoga Tantras. These developments appear to be happening at more or less the same time in all three areas.

Jayanta Bhatta, the 9th-century scholar of the Nyaya school of Hindu philosophy and who commented on Tantra literature, stated that the Tantric ideas and spiritual practices are mostly well placed, but it also has "immoral teachings" such as by the so-called "Nilambara" sect where its practitioners "wear simply one blue garment, and then as a group engage in unconstrained public sex" on festivals. He wrote, this practice is unnecessary and it threatens fundamental values of society.

Douglas Renfrew Brooks states that the antinomian elements such as the use of intoxicating substances and sex were not animistic, but were adopted in some Kaula traditions to challenge the Tantric devotee to break down the "distinctions between the ultimate reality of Brahman and the mundane physical and mundane world". By combining erotic and ascetic techniques, states Brooks, the Tantric broke down all social and internal assumptions, became Shiva-like. In Kashmir Shaivism, states David Gray, the antinomian transgressive ideas were internalized, for meditation and reflection, and as a means to "realize a transcendent subjectivity".

Tantric sexual practices are often seen as exceptional and elite, and not accepted by all sects. They are found only in some tantric literature belonging to Buddhist and Hindu Tantra, but are entirely absent from Jain Tantra. In the Kaula tradition and others where sexual fluids as power substances and ritual sex are mentioned, scholars disagree in their translations, interpretations and practical significance. Yet, emotions, eroticism and sex are universally regarded in Tantric literature as natural, desirable, a means of transformation of the deity within, to "reflect and recapitulate the bliss of Shiva and Shakti". Pleasure and sex is another aspect of life and a "root of the universe", whose purpose extends beyond procreation and is another means to spiritual journey and fulfillment.

This idea flowers with the inclusion of kama art in Hindu temple arts, and its various temple architecture and design manuals such as the Shilpa-prakasha by the Hindu scholar Ramachandra Kulacara.

Practices
Tantric sex is strongly associated with the practice of semen retention, as sexual fluids are considered an energetical substance that must be reserved. However, while there is already a mention of ascetics practicing it in the 4th century CE Mahabharata, those techniques were rare until late Buddhist Tantra. Up to that point, sexual emission was both allowed and emphasized.

In its earliest forms, Tantric intercourse was usually directed to generate sexual fluids that constituted the "preferred offering of the Tantric deities." Some extreme texts would go further, such as the 9th century Buddhist text Candamaharosana-tantra, which advocated consumption of bodily waste products of the practitioner's sexual partner, like wash-water of her anus and genitalia. Those were thought to be "power substances", teaching the waste should be consumed as a diet "eaten by all the Buddhas."

Around the start of the first millennium, Tantra registered practices of semen retention, like the penance ceremony of asidharavrata and the posterior yogic technique of vajroli mudra. They were probably adopted from ancient, non-Tantric celibate schools, like those mentioned in Mahabharata. Buddhist Tantric works further directed the focus away from sexual emission towards retention and intentionally prolonged bliss, thus "interiorizing" the tantric offering of fluids directed to the deities.

As part of tantric inversion of social regulations, sexual yoga often recommends the usage of consorts from the most taboo groups available, such as close relatives or people from the lowest, most contaminated castes. They must be young and beautiful, as well as initiates in tantra.

In Hinduism
Ascetics of the Shaivite school of Mantramarga, in order to gain supernatural power, reenacted the penance of Shiva after cutting off one of Brahma's heads (Bhikshatana). They worshipped Shiva with impure substances like alcohol, blood and sexual fluids generated in orgiastic rites with their consorts.

In Buddhism
Buddhist sexual rites were incorporated from Shaiva tantra, becoming even more explicitly erotic and transgressive in the process. Deities like Vajrayogini, sexually suggestive and streaming with blood, overturn traditional separation between intercourse and menstruation.

Tibetan Buddhism
In Tibetan Buddhism, as usual in tantra, semen must be retained in order to attain enlightenment. This is accomplished either through mental discipline or by pressuring the perineum at the point of orgasm, through which the spermatic duct is blocked. If the practitioner nonetheless ejaculates, he must retrieve the semen and drink it. Emission of semen is reserved only to those who are already enlightened, who can perform ejaculation as long as they don't lose awareness.

As in Indian alchemy, menstrual blood is also utilized as a ritual substance, as it is part of the mix of male and female sexual fluids (sukra) the yogi must consume. He can obtain the woman's fluid during intercourse, by absorbing it into his own body with vajroli mudra after ejaculation, or even without ejaculation if he is skilled enough. It is also possible to recover the sukra out of her body in a vase or human skull (kapala) in order to consume it. The Candamaharosana Tantra even recommends not to drink it, but to suck it up with a tube through the nose. Several women can be employed one after another.

Female practitioners or yogini can also perform a reverse of this technique by obtaining their partners' semen. The dakinis are described to entertain themselves by stealing the male sperm both in waking and in dream.

Kalachakra Tantra
Kalachakra Tantra, an 11th-century Tibetan Buddhist tradition, is divided in fifteen stages. Seven are public and ceremonial, while the remaining eight contain practices of sexual yoga and are kept secret, being reserved for a handful of initiates. The master officiant becomes symbolically an androgynous being who is both Kalachakra and Vishvamata, male and female.

Among the eight higher stages, for the first four the apprentice must bring the lama a young woman of ten, twelve, sixteen, or twenty years of age as karmamudrā.

In the eighth, the woman is touched on the breasts in a sexual manner to stimulate the apprentice, during which the latter must avoid ejaculation.
In the ninth, the apprentice is blindfolded or made to leave temporally. The master has intercourse with the woman and ejaculates, and the resultant mixture of both male and female sexual fluids (sukra) is tasted by the apprentice. In another version, the apprentice tastes the master's semen ("bodhicitta") directly from his penis.
In the tenth, the apprentice is offered a woman. He must have intercourse with her without ejaculating.
The eleventh stage is internal, referring to the apprentice's resultant enlightening.

The remaining stages take place in a ganachakra, where ten young women of between twelve and twenty form a circle. They adopt the names and roles of the apprentice's female relatives, with one of them becoming symbolically his wife, and other being chosen by the master as his own wife (shabdavajra). The women perform naked and with their hair loose, and hold kapala with taboo substances. They are considered sacrifices, who die to be reborn as dakinis. After the ceremony, they are given presents.

In the twelfth stage, the master has intercourse with his woman in the center of the circle, after which places his penis filled with "bodhicitta" in the apprentice's mouth. Then he gives the apprentice his own wife.
In the thirteenth, the master places his penis in the mouth of the apprentice's wife. He then orally stimulates his own wife's clitoris (naranasika).
In the fourteenth, the master gives the women to the apprentice. The latter must have intercourse with as many of them as possible, for at least 24 minutes each.
In the fifteenth, the apprentice is considered to have attained perfection.

Japanese Buddhism
12th century Japanese school Tachikawa-ryu didn't discourage ejaculation in itself, considering it a "shower of love that contained thousands of potential Buddhas". They employed emission of sexual fluids in combination with worshipping of human skulls, which would be coated in the resultant mix in order to create honzon. However, those practices were considered heretic, leading to the sect's suppression.

See also

 Cakrasaṃvara Tantra
 Coitus reservatus
 Sex magic
 Sexercise
 Taoist sexual practices
 Yab-yum
 Yogini

References

Sources

 
 
 
 
 
 
 
 
 
 
 
 
 
 
 
 
 
 

Tantra
Vajrayana
Tantric practices
Human sexuality
Sexual acts
Sexuality and religion